Sergey Leonidovich Sholokhov (born September 27, 1958, Leningrad) is a Russian (formerly Soviet) journalist, Candidate of Art Sciences, and winner of the national competition of the press, Golden Pen '96  (Journalist of the Year). Academician of the Academy Nika Award.

He has been called one of the most  authoritative film and theater critics of Russia.

In 1991 Sholokhov and Sergey Kuryokhin broadcast the influential televised hoax Lenin was a mushroom.

Since 1991 and 1992 he worked in the management School at Harvard University as a visiting researcher.

Member of the jury of numerous film festivals. Author and producer of 10 documentaries.

References

External links
  Тихий Шолохов
 Сергей Шолохов: Ленин и грибы. Интервью на сайте журнала «Интервью»

1958 births
Living people
Journalists from Saint Petersburg
Soviet journalists
Russian male journalists
Soviet television presenters
Russian television presenters
Saint Petersburg State University alumni
Russian film critics
Academicians of the Russian Academy of Cinema Arts and Sciences "Nika"
Soviet art historians
Soviet male writers
20th-century Russian male writers
Russian art historians